Miguel Puche García (born 30 April 2001) is a Spanish footballer who plays as a forward for Real Zaragoza.

Club career
Born in Tarazona, Zaragoza, Aragon, Puche played for CD Tudelano as a youth. On 8 October 2017, aged just 16, he made his first team debut by playing the last five minutes of a 1–0 Segunda División B home win against SD Leioa.

In the 2018 summer, after six appearances with the main squad, Puche moved to Real Zaragoza and returned to the youth setup. He was promoted to the reserves in the Tercera División in August 2020, and scored his first senior goal on 8 December by netting his team's fifth in a 6–0 home routing of CD Valdefierro.

Puche made his professional debut for Zaragoza on 13 August 2021, coming on as a late substitute for Iván Azón in a 0–0 home draw against UD Ibiza in the Segunda División. He scored his first professional goal on 11 March of the following year, netting the winner in a 2–1 home success over CF Fuenlabrada.

On 1 September 2022, Puche signed a professional contract until 2025, being definitely promoted to the main squad.

References

External links

2001 births
Living people
People from Tarazona y el Moncayo
Sportspeople from the Province of Zaragoza
Spanish footballers
Footballers from Aragon
Association football forwards
Segunda División players
Segunda División B players
Tercera División players
Tercera Federación players
CD Tudelano footballers
Real Zaragoza B players
Real Zaragoza players